The 22993/22994 Bandra Terminus–Mahuva Superfast Express is a Superfast train belonging to Western Railway zone that runs between  and  in India. It is currently being operated with 22993/22994 train numbers on a weekly basis.

Service

22993/Bandra Terminus–Mahuva Superfast Express has an average speed of 56 km/hr and covers 883 km in 15h 45m.
22994/Mahuva–Bandra Terminus Superfast Express has an average speed of 57 km/hr and covers 883 km in 15h 30m.

Route and halts 

The important halts of the train are:

Schedule

Coach composition

The train has standard LHB rakes with max speed of 130 kmph. The train consists of 16 coaches:

 1 AC II Tier
 1 AC III Tier
 9 Sleeper coaches
 3 General Unreserved
 2 End-on Generator

Traction

Both trains are hauled by a Vadodara Loco Shed-based WAP-5 or WAP-4E electric locomotive from Bandra to Ahmedabad. From Ahmedabad to Mahuva, the train is hauled by Vatva-based WDM-3A.

Rake sharing

The train shares its rake with 22989/22990 Bandra Terminus–Mahuva Express and 22991/22992 Bandra Terminus–Veraval Superfast Express.

See also 

 Mahuva Junction railway station
 Bandra Terminus railway station

Notes

References

External links 

 22993/Bandra Terminus - Mahuva Superfast Express India Rail Info
 22994/Mahuva - Bandra Terminus Superfast Express India Rail Info

Transport in Mumbai
Express trains in India
Rail transport in Maharashtra
Rail transport in Gujarat
Railway services introduced in 2017